Richard Greeman (born Aug. 11, 1939 in New York City) is a Marxist scholar long active in human rights, anti-war, anti-nuclear, environmental and labor struggles in the U.S., Latin America, France, and Russia. Greeman is best known for his studies and translations of the Franco-Russian novelist and revolutionary Victor Serge (1890–1947). Greeman also writes regularly about politics, international class struggles and revolutionary theory. Co-founder of the Praxis Research and Education Center in Moscow, Russia, and director of the International Victor Serge Foundation, Greeman splits his time between Montpellier, France and New York City.

Early life and education

Greeman describes himself as a ‘Red-diaper grand baby’ who inherited the socialist books and  ideas of his maternal grandfather, Sam Levin, in immigrant Russian-Jewish tailor from Hartford, CT. His father, Edward Greeman, was a decorated World War I ambulance driver, 1948 American Labor Party candidate for N.Y. Assembly, and a Veterans Against the War in the Vietnam era. Richard graduated from Mamaroneck High School in Mamaroneck, N.Y. in 1957 and entered Yale College, where as a Freshman he became active in the George Orwell Forum and joined the Young People's Socialist League (YPSL).   
 
During his 1959-60 Junior Year in Paris, Greeman participated in the anti-Algerian war movement as a member of the group Socialisme ou Barbarie (Socialism or Barbarism). Returning to Yale in 1960, he helped found the New Haven chapters of the Congress of Racial Equality (CORE) and Fair Play for Cuba Committee. Greeman encountered Raya Dunayevskaya after reading her Marxism and Freedom  and joined her Marxist-Humanist organization News & Letters Committees, where he remained active until 1973, when he was ousted by the central leadership after being denied a hearing.  
 
In 1961 Greeman enrolled in Columbia University, where as a graduate student and French teaching assistant, he was active in CORE, the Independent Committee Against the War in Vietnam, and Students for a Democratic Society. Greeman participated in the 1968 Columbia rebellion as a Junior Faculty member in support of the Strike Committee, and he received his Ph.D. at the ‘Counter-Commencement’ on the student-occupied campus.

Academic and political career

During 1963-64, Greeman returned to Paris with a French Government scholarship, took courses at the Sorbonne, began his research on the life and works of Victor Serge (1890–1947) whom he admired both as a novelist, a revolutionary witness, and a libertarian socialist thinker. In Paris Greeman was befriended by Serge's son, the Russian-Mexican painter Vlady, who encouraged his research and authorized him to translate Serge's fiction into English. To date, Greeman has translated and introduced five Serge novels, most recently Unforgiving Years, voted one of Time Out New York's "Best of 2008." Greeman has also prefaced and edited a number of Serge's books in French.  
 
From 1964 to 1970 Greeman taught French and Humanities at Columbia College, then at Wesleyan University in Middletown, CT where he was active in anti-war, labor and Black Panthers’ defense groups and helped organize the May 1970 Student Strike which occupied the University. In 1973 he was denied tenure in a controversial case. In 1975 he became the father of Jenny Greeman, and joined the faculty of the University of Hartford in West Hartford, CT. Greeman was active in the Hartford Coalition for Justice in Central America, with CISPES and Nicaragua Network and in the defense of the Macheteros -- Puerto Rican Socialist Party defendants in the famous West Hartford Wells Fargo ‘Robin Hood’ robbery. Greeman also traveled to Sandinista Nicaragua in the summer of 1984 to observe the elections and join Witness for Peace during the Contra war on the border of Honduras.  Twice rejected for tenure at the University of Hartford, he won on appeal and retired to France in 1997 to devote himself to writing and political work.

Projects in Russia

In 1991, during Russia's perestroika period, Greeman travelled to Petersburg and Moscow as part of the first group of informali : U.S. political, labor and environmental activists invited by their Russian counterparts. In 1993 Greeman organized the ‘Books For Struggle’ drive, collecting 88 cartons of non-Stalinist Left books and periodicals to be shipped to Russia. In 1997, he helped establish the Victor Serge Public Library in Moscow and in 1998 co-founded the Praxis Research and Education Center in Moscow, which promotes anti-totalitarian socialism in the ex-Soviet space. Praxis has published Serge's works for the first time in Russian translation as well as books by anarchists like Volin and libertarian Marxists like Maximilian Rubel and Raya Dunayevskaya. Praxis also publishes a newspaper, Free Thought, and holds annual international conferences. These projects are funded in part by the Victor Serge Foundation Inc., a 501(c)(3) US non-profit, established in 1997 by Vlady Kibalchich, Serge's son, with Greeman as Secretary, to accept tax-free contributions and promote Serge's writings and philosophy internationally. The Foundation is currently underwriting Arabic translations of Serge and related authors.

Writings

Greeman's essays on Serge have appeared in Yale French Studies, TriQuarterly, the Massachusetts Review, New Politics, Revolutionary History, International Socialism, ReThinking Marxism and Vuelta (Mexico). Greeman's political writings deal with international politics (strikes in France, struggles in Russia,  revolt in the Arab world, the Euro crisis, as well as revolutionary history (1968), Marxist economics, and the theory of revolutionary self-organization.  
 
Greeman's major essays have been collected in / Beware of ‘Vegetarian’ Sharks : Radical Rants and Internationalist Essays (Illustrated). Reviewer Ian Birchall found Vegetarian Sharks a ‘useful volume’ containing ‘much of interest to historians of the socialist movement,’ but ‘excessively optimistic about the Internet’ and 'poorly proofread.' Birchall described Greeman's critique of Leninism  as ‘nuanced,’ but ‘weak because the alternative forms of organization he prefers are, on his own admission “ephemeral.”’ Reviewer Eli Messinger ‘found his candor refreshing. Greeman’s is not a heavily footnoted, scholarly treatise. His lively style is likely to make this book particularly attractive to younger readers as will the high drama of Victor Serge’s life story. […] Greeman’s work brings to light people and events in our recent past which deserve to be known by those struggling today.’

Political Ideas

Individual Freedom
Greeman argues that liberty of expression and freedom of assembly are not abstract principles but practical necessities for masses of people (as opposed to dictators) to seize and hold power. ‘In politics,’ Greeman observes, ‘Means determine the End.’ The tragedy of the Russian Revolution proved to early Communists like Serge that democratic Means—pluralism, respect for the ‘other,’ freedom of opinion, the availability of unbiased information—alone enable ordinary working people reach the End of true socialism, described by Marx as ‘new human society’ where “the freedom of the individual is the basis of the freedom of all.”

Non-Violence
A veteran of the American civil rights movement, Greeman sees mass non-violent resistance as both an effective tactic and a social ethic. ‘Against an adversary with endless weapons of mass destruction and surveillance systems, the resort to revolutionary violence is tactical and literal suicide. On the other hand, the ethic of non-violence promotes cooperation and encourages the participation of women, humanity’s majority group, whose leadership is essential in the struggle for a just and safe planet.’ Greeman—who in the 1960s was personally close to several members of the ‘Weather Underground’ and worked with the CT Black Panthers in the 1970s—rejects individual violence. ‘Throughout history, the world’s police have always resorted to agents provocateurs to infiltrate social movements and provoke violence, thus justifying state terrorism against the masses. Why do their job for them?’ he asks.

Self-organization
Greeman sees the juxtaposition of Spontaneity and Organization as a ‘false opposition.’ The important  distinction, he maintains, is between vertical bureaucratic organization  and horizontal mass self-organization. He decries ‘rule or ruin’ approach of revolutionary parties who attempt to impose their ‘correct’ political line by taking over meetings and dominating broad coalitions. By stifling open debate and inhibiting the spontaneous emergence of mass self-organization, such self-appointed leaderships, with their factional rivalries, ultimately isolate and demoralize the movements they seek to lead.  Greeman cites examples ranging from the manipulations of Stalin's Comintern in the ‘30s to factionalism in the U.S. anti-war movement in the 1960s and 1980s. In place of building a vertical Party to lead the revolution, Greeman proposes developing a critical, Marxist-humanist world-view and  support for emergent horizontal self-organization leading to a planetary federation of assemblies where masses of ordinary people discuss and decide things for themselves.

Internationalism
Greeman believes in ‘Acting locally while thinking and networking globally’ within the ultimate perspective of a planetary general strike organized by a global federation linked by videostream connecting popular assemblies of  creative/working people around the world. Greeman asserts that in a globalized age of multinational corporations, the masses’ defense against global capitalism's increasingly aggressive attacks must also be global. ‘How can you win a strike,’ he asks, 'when management can ship your job to overseas dictatorships where workers are forced to work for less?’ For Greeman, political tactics should be based on an internationalist ‘Rule of Thumb:’ ‘Will this tactic increase solidarity with people of other nationalities and identities, or divide them?’ and ‘Will this tactic move us closer to our ultimate goal – a new human society?’

The Utopian Bet
A hopeful pessimist, Greeman posited the odds on human society surviving capitalism's economic and ecological crises until 2100 as a nominal one in a hundred. But if there were such a ‘chance,’ we would have to take it. Mathematically, the leap to Ecotopia is [A Bet We Can't Refuse].’ Following Pascal and Marx he asked: ‘What have we left to lose but a few more desperate years of struggling to survive in an increasingly violent, unhealthy, unequal, disintegrating society?’ Not much, with a beautiful green world to win (and heal)!’

Greeman’s Modern Archimedes Hypothesis 
Greeman argued that such a Utopian vision is both historically and scientifically defensible. In 1997, Greeman proposed as a model a ‘Modern Archimedes Hypothesis’ outlining how the world's billions could collectively ‘lift the Earth’ out if its catastrophic capitalist orbit.  This model proposed a Social Lever (‘planetary solidarity’), a Philosophical Fulcrum (‘planetary consciousness’), and a Place to Stand where the masses (the 99%) could unite their strength (the Virtual Platform of the Internet). Rejecting the notion that the Internet was an elitist gadget developed by the U.S. military and destined to be monopolized by commercial interests, Greeman saw the expanding Web as a potential class struggle weapon: one that would transform a revolutionary dream—the international general strike—into a technical possibility.

Greeman observed that popular self-organization has been historically linked to progress in communications technology since the 18th Century. The American and French Revolutionaries depended on cheap printed pamphlets and the newly established Postal Service to unite their  Committees of Correspondence. During the rolling revolutions of 1848 the penny-press and telegraph spread the insurrections from Paris to Vienna to the rest of Europe in days. Greeman observed that 20th Century one-way broadcasting technology favored the top-down power of demagogues and dictators from Churchill and Roosevelt to Hitler and Stalin.

On the other hand, Greeman saw interactive Internet technology with its ‘hacker ethic’ and freeware mentality as an essentially egalitarian form of ‘emergent’ self-organization. It could also overcome the parochial nationalisms that have always divided humanity. He called the Internet international ‘a vast conspiracy whose center is everywhere and nowhere!’`

Billions vs. Billionaires

In 1999 Greeman projected this Ecopopian vision into an evolutive, collective science-fiction project. Greeman’s ‘Dream of Revolutionary Emergence’ begins when a multi-player online computer-game called ‘Billions and Billionaires’ goes viral, leading to a planetary general strike and the women of the world join in a dance-craze which goes viral and brings the macho madness of capitalist over-production and war-making to a grinding halt. In his ‘Dream of Utopias’ (based on Castoriadis’ 1958 The Content of Socialism) community and workplace General Assemblies federate on a global scale and begin the arduous work of repairing a severely damaged planet.

References

Living people
Columbia University alumni
Yale College alumni
Wesleyan University faculty
Year of birth missing (living people)
Mamaroneck High School alumni